Knights of the Maccabees Hall, also known as Cheshire Meeting Hall, is a historic meeting hall located at Cheshire, Ontario County, New York. It was built in 1898, and is a 1/1/2-story, rectangular, frame building with a front-gable roof and clad in clapboard siding.  It measures 36.6 feet wide and 65 feet long and rests on a stone and concrete foundation with basement.  In addition to the Knights of the Maccabees, the building also hosted a local chapter of the Grand Army of the Republic and the Cheshire Grange, who purchased the building in 1920. The building has hosted numerous community events.

It was listed on the National Register of Historic Places in 2013.

References

Grange buildings on the National Register of Historic Places in New York (state)
Buildings and structures completed in 1898
Buildings and structures in Ontario County, New York
National Register of Historic Places in Ontario County, New York
Knights of the Maccabees